Ochtman is a surname. Notable people with the surname include:

 Dorothy Ochtman (1892–1971), American painter
 Leonard Ochtman (1854–1934), Dutch-American painter
 Mina Fonda Ochtman (1862–1924), American painter